German submarine U-561 was a Type VIIC U-boat built for Nazi Germany's Kriegsmarine for service during World War II.
She was laid down on 28 February 1940 by Blohm & Voss in Hamburg as yard number 537, launched on 23 January 1941 and commissioned on 13 March 1941 under Kapitänleutnant Robert Bartels (German Cross in Gold).

Design
German Type VIIC submarines were preceded by the shorter Type VIIB submarines. U-561 had a displacement of  when at the surface and  while submerged. She had two shafts and two  propellers.

U-561 was fitted with five  torpedo tubes (four fitted at the bow and one at the stern), fourteen torpedoes, one  SK C/35 naval gun, 220 rounds, and a  C/30 anti-aircraft gun. The boat had a complement of between forty-four and sixty.

Service history
The boat's service began on 13 March 1941 with training as part of the 1st U-boat Flotilla. During late July 1941, U-561, along with 9 other German and Italian submarines, attacked convoy OG 69 en route from Liverpool to Gibraltar. U-561 torpedoed and sank the 1,884 GRT British freighter Wrotham. 

In November 1941, while travelling across the Atlantic ocean, she sunk two boats from convoy SC 53, the Meridian and the Cruisader.

She was transferred to the 23rd flotilla on 1 February 1942.

She was sunk by torpedoes fired from Royal Navy's HMS MTB-81 on 12 July 1943 at position  in the Straits of Messina.

Wolfpacks
She took part in two wolfpacks, namely:
Bosemüller (28 August – 2 September 1941)
Seewolf (2 – 15 September 1941)

Summary of raiding history

References

Bibliography

External links

Ships lost with all hands
German Type VIIC submarines
1941 ships
U-boats commissioned in 1941
U-boats sunk in 1943
U-boats sunk by British warships
World War II submarines of Germany
World War II shipwrecks in the Mediterranean Sea
Ships built in Hamburg
Maritime incidents in July 1943